"Girls Ride Horses Too" is a song recorded by American country music artist Judy Rodman.  It was released in February 1987 as the first single from the album A Place Called Love.  The song reached #7 on the Billboard Hot Country Singles & Tracks chart.  The song was written by Alice Randall and Mark D. Sanders.  The "B Side" of this single does not appear on any LP.

Chart performance

References

1987 singles
1987 songs
Judy Rodman songs
Songs written by Mark D. Sanders
MTM Records singles
Song recordings produced by Tommy West (producer)